The Château de Diedendorf is a Renaissance style château situated in the commune of Diedendorf in the département of Bas-Rhin, Grand Est, France.

It was completed in 1580.

External links
 Website 

Houses completed in 1580
Châteaux in Bas-Rhin
Historic house museums in Grand Est
Museums in Bas-Rhin